The Chile national futsal team is controlled by the Federación de Fútbol de Chile, the governing body for futsal in Chile and represents the country in international futsal competitions, such as the World Cup and the Copa América.

Tournament records

FIFA Futsal World Cup
 1989 - did not enter
 1992 - did not enter
 1996 - did not qualify
 2000 - did not qualify
 2004 - did not qualify
 2008 - did not qualify
 2012 - did not qualify
 2016 - did not qualify
 2020 - did not qualify

Copa América
 1965 - did not enter
 1969 - did not enter
 1971 - did not enter
 1973 - did not enter
 1975 - did not enter
 1976 - did not enter
 1977 - did not enter
 1979 - did not enter
 1983 - did not enter
 1986 - 6th place
 1989 - did not enter
 1992 - did not enter
 1995 - did not enter
 1996 - 1st round
 1997 - did not enter
 1998 - did not enter
 1999 - did not enter
 2000 - 1st round
 2003 - 10th place
 2008 - 10th place
 2011 - 9th place
 2015 - 5th place
 2017 - 10th place
 2022 - 10th place

FIFA Futsal World Cup qualification (CONMEBOL)/CONMEBOL Preliminary Competition
 2012 – 6th place
 2016 – 9th place

FIFUSA/AMF Futsal World Cup
 1982 – did not enter
 1985 – did not enter
 1988 – did not enter
 1991 – did not enter
 1994 – 1st round (forfeited)
 1997 – did not enter
 2000 – did not enter
 2003 – 1st round
 2007 – did not enter
 2011 – did not enter
 2015 – did not enter
 2019 – TBD

Grand Prix de Futsal
 2005 – did not enter
 2006 – 6th place
 2007 – 14th place
 2008 – 14th place
 2009 – did not enter
 2010 – did not enter
 2011 – did not enter
 2013 – did not enter
 2014 – did not enter
 2015 – did not enter
 2017 – TBD

Futsal Confederations Cup
 2009 – did not enter
 2013 –  3rd place
 2014 – did not enter

References

External links
 FIFA
 CONMEBOL

Chile
National sports teams of Chile
Futsal in Chile